Western Wind may refer to:

Music
 Westron Wynde, an early 16th-century song
 "Western Wind" (song), by Carly Rae Jepsen, 2022
 Western Wind, a 1995 album by Warren H Williams

Literature
 Western Wind, a 1949 play by Charlotte Francis
 Western Wind, a historical romance novel series by Janelle Taylor
 Western Wind, a 1993 children's novel by Paula Fox
 The Western Wind, a 2018 novel by Samantha Harvey

Other uses
 Western Wind, a Thoroughbred racehorse that ran in the 1977 Kentucky Derby

See also
 West wind, a wind that originates in the west, and its representations in mythology and literature